Rupert Street can mean:

 Rupert Street in London's Soho area, dating back to the 1600s
 Rupert Street (Bristol), an area of Bristol in the United Kingdom
 Rupert Street (Vancouver), a street in Vancouver, Canada